Zotalemimon is a genus of longhorn beetles of the subfamily Lamiinae, containing the following species:

 Zotalemimon bhutanum (Breuning, 1975)
 Zotalemimon biapicatum (Breuning, 1940)
 Zotalemimon biplagiatum (Breuning, 1940)
 Zotalemimon borneoticum (Breuning, 1969)
 Zotalemimon chapaense (Breuning, 1966)
 Zotalemimon ciliatum (Gressitt, 1942)
 Zotalemimon costatum (Matsushita, 1933)
 Zotalemimon flavolineatum (Breuning, 1975)
 Zotalemimon formosanum (Breuning, 1975)
 Zotalemimon fossulatum (Breuning, 1943)
 Zotalemimon lineatoides (Breuning, 1969)
 Zotalemimon luteonotatum Pic, 1925
 Zotalemimon malinum (Gressitt, 1951)
 Zotalemimon obscurior (Breuning, 1940)
 Zotalemimon posticatum (Gahan, 1894)
 Zotalemimon procerum (Pascoe, 1859)
 Zotalemimon puncticollis (Breuning, 1949)
 Zotalemimon strandi (Breuning, 1940)
 Zotalemimon subglabratum (Gressitt, 1938)
 Zotalemimon subpuncticollis (Breuning, 1975)
 Zotalemimon sybroides (Breuning, 1939)
 Zotalemimon vitalisi (Pic, 1938)

References

 
Desmiphorini